Georges Rawiri (March 10, 1932 – April 9, 2006) was a Gabonese politician, diplomat and poet.

Biography
Rawiri was born in western Gabon. He became a prominent government official  in 1967 when President Omar Bongo took office, with Bongo and Rawiri becoming close friends. Rawiri served as Minister of Foreign Affairs from 1971 to 1974; as of 1981, he was First Deputy Prime Minister in charge of Transport and the Merchant Marine. In 1997, when the Senate was established, he became its President. He was unanimously re-elected as President of the Senate on 26 February 2003, remaining in that post until his death. He died in April 2006 at a hospital in Paris, France.

At the time of his death, Rawiri was Co-President of the Africa Caribbean Pacific - European Union (ACP-EU) Joint Parliamentary Assembly.

Bongo declared seven days of mourning for Rawiri, beginning on April 10, 2006. Bongo said that Rawiri had been "more than a brother, a parent" to him, describing him as an unprecedented individual in the country's history.

His daughter, Angèle Rawiri, is a well-known novelist.

After Rawiri's death, the Georges Rawiri House, intended to serve as the headquarters of the RTG1 television channel, was built with Chinese assistance and inaugurated on December 1, 2007.

References

1932 births
2006 deaths
Presidents of the Senate of Gabon
Foreign ministers of Gabon
Grand Officiers of the Légion d'honneur
Gabonese Democratic Party politicians
Gabonese poets
Gabonese novelists
Male novelists
Gabonese male writers
20th-century poets
Male poets
20th-century novelists
20th-century politicians
21st-century Gabonese politicians
21st-century diplomats
20th-century male writers
21st-century Gabonese people